Peter Brandes (born 5 March 1944 in Assens, Denmark) is a Danish painter, sculptor, ceramic artist and photographer.

Brandes' art is abstract and often in brown colours. He had his breakthrough as artist in the beginning of the 1980s. He has, inter alia, done artwork on Roskilde Domkirke and mosaic (colored glass) windows in a church at Nordkap and the church Village of Hope, south of Los Angeles. In 1998, he created the enormous Roskilde Jars which stand outside the main Roskilde Railway Station.

Brandes is self-taught and his art circles around themes from Christianity. Ancient Greek mythology has also inspired his art. Brandes has illustrated a number of books, for example Homer’s Iliad. A great part of Brandes' ceramic works are inspired by ancient Greek art and mythology.

Brades now lives in Colombes near Paris together with his wife Maja Lise Engelhardt who is also a painter.

Represented
Statens Museum for Kunst
ARoS Aarhus Kunstmuseum
Ny Carlsberg Glyptotek
Danish Museum of Art & Design
Vejle Kunstmuseum
Kunstmuseet Trapholt
Nordjyllands Kunstmuseum
Horsens Kunstmuseum
Randers Kunstmuseum
Sønderjyllands Kunstmuseum
Skovgaard museum
Funen's Art Museum
Danmarks Keramikmuseum – Grimmerhus
Cornerstone_University|Cornerstone University Chapel

References

1944 births
Living people
People from Assens Municipality
20th-century Danish photographers
21st-century Danish photographers
Danish photographers
20th-century Danish painters
21st-century Danish painters
Abstract painters
Recipients of the Eckersberg Medal
20th-century Danish sculptors
Male sculptors
Lutheran art
Danish male artists
20th-century Danish male artists